Mid-America Baptist Theological Seminary is a theological institute located in Cordova in Shelby County, Tennessee (east of the City of Memphis), with a branch campus in Schenectady, New York, and an extension campus in Oxford, Mississippi.  Though its beliefs and practices are in line with the conservative wing of the Southern Baptist Convention, it is not operated by the denomination itself.

History
The school was founded in 1971 as the "School of the Prophets" in Louisiana, but no classes were held.The following year it was moved to Little Rock, Arkansas, and the name was changed to Mid-America Baptist Theological Seminary. In 1976 the school moved to Memphis, Tennessee, on the old campus of Temple Israel. In 1996 the school moved to a larger campus in South Germantown, Tennessee, in the quarters of the old Germantown Baptist Church. In 2006 the school moved to Cordova, Tennessee across the street from the Bellevue Baptist Church into a new $28 million facility located on 51 acres (35 donated by Bellevue and 16 purchased by the Seminary).

Notable alumni
Brandt Smith, member of the Arkansas House of Representatives since 2015

References

External links
 Official website

Education in Lafayette County, Mississippi
Education in Schenectady County, New York
Education in Shelby County, Tennessee
Seminaries and theological colleges in Tennessee
Universities and colleges accredited by the Southern Association of Colleges and Schools
Universities and colleges in the Memphis Metro Area
Educational institutions established in 1971
1971 establishments in Tennessee
Baptist seminaries and theological colleges in the United States